Mamre may refer to the following places:

 Mamre, an ancient shrine focused on a holy tree, north of Hebron
 Oak of Mamre an ancient tree in the grounds of the Russian Orthodox Monastery of the Holy Trinity, Hebron
 Mamre, St Marys, New South Wales, Australia
 Mamre, Western Cape, South Africa
 Mamre Nature Garden
 Mamre Township, Kandiyohi County, Minnesota, United States

See also